New Century Club, and variations, may refer to:

in the United States
(by state then city)
 New Century Club (Milford, Delaware), now the Delaware Children's Theatre, a historic women's clubhouse listed on the National Register of Historic Places (NRHP) in Kent County
 New Century Club (Wilmington, Delaware), a historic women's clubhouse on the NRHP
 New Century Club (Philadelphia, Pennsylvania)
 New Century Club (Utica, New York), a historic women's clubhouse on the NRHP
New Century Clubhouse (West Chester, Pennsylvania), listed on the NRHP

See also
 Century Club (disambiguation)
 New Century Guild, Philadelphia, Pennsylvania
 Twentieth Century Club (disambiguation)